Thomas R. Metcalf (born May 31, 1934) is a historian of South Asia, especially colonial India, and of the British Empire.  Metcalf is the Emeritus Sarah Kailath Professor of India Studies and Professor of History at the University of California, Berkeley.  He is the author of Imperial Connections: India in the Indian Ocean Arena, 1860-1920 (2008), A Concise History of Modern India (with Barbara Metcalf, 2006), Forging the Raj: Essays on British India in the Heyday of Empire (2005), Ideologies of the Raj (1997), and other books on the history of colonial India.

He was educated at Amherst College, the University of Cambridge and Harvard University. He is married to historian Barbara D. Metcalf.

Selected bibliography

References

1934 births
Living people
21st-century American historians
21st-century American male writers
Historians of South Asia
Harvard University alumni
Amherst College alumni
Alumni of the University of Cambridge
American male non-fiction writers